Boris Ivanowski was an officer of the Russian Imperial Guard who went into exile after the Russian revolution and made his way to fame in the 1920s as a racecar driver.

Race results

Irish International Grand Prix winners

Complete European Championship results
(key) (Races in bold indicate pole position) (Races in italics indicate fastest lap)

Complete 24 Hours of Le Mans results

References

External links
 https://web.archive.org/web/20070929150831/http://archives.tcm.ie/businesspost/2007/03/04/story21540.asp 
 1929 Irish Grand Prix Pathé News

Russian racing drivers
Grand Prix drivers
24 Hours of Le Mans drivers
24 Hours of Spa drivers
European Championship drivers
1893 births
Year of death missing
White Russian emigrants